Hyles vespertilio is a moth of the  family Sphingidae.

Distribution 

It is found in central Europe and the Balkan Peninsula, as well as from Anatolia to the Caucasus. It has been recorded from southern and eastern France, southern Germany, Switzerland, Austria, northern and central Italy, Czech Republic, Slovakia, eastern Poland, western Ukraine, western Hungary, Slovenia, Croatia, Bosnia, southern and Central Serbia, northern Albania, western and southern Bulgaria and northern Greece. Outside of Europe, the range extends over western Turkey, east to Transcaucasia. There is an isolated population in the mountains of Lebanon.

Description 
The wingspan is 60–80 mm. There are two forms, f. salmonea does not have the red color on the hind wing, f. flava is black and has yellow hind wings. In the French Alps, the natural hybrid with Hyles hippophaes is found.

Biology 
Adults are on wing from May to June and from August to September in a partial second generation in most of the range. On high altitudes in central Europe and Bulgaria, there is only one generation from June to July.

The larvae feed on Epilobium species (including Epilobium dodonaei), Oenothera and Galium.

References

External links

 Hyles vespertilio, Moths and Butterflies of Europe and North Africa
 Hyles vespertilio, lepiforum.de
 Hyles vespertilio, schmetterling-raupe.de

Hyles (moth)
Moths described in 1793
Moths of Europe
Moths of Asia
Taxa named by Eugenius Johann Christoph Esper